The Welsh Judo Association (WJA) is the governing body for the sport of judo in Wales. The WJA has 80 affiliated clubs and over 2,400 members. It is responsible for managing the Welsh Performance Squads the  National Coach selects the Welsh national team to compete in international events. Double judo Olympic silver medallist Neil Adams is a former WJA National Coach.

Marc Longhurst has been the WJA chairman since 2021.

A purpose-built GBP1.1m dojo opened at the Institute in October 2009 to house the WJA, allowing the full-time tutorage of promising athletes.

Natalie Powell was the first athlete from the National Judo Centre to qualify for the Olympic Games. Natalie Powell made it to the quarter-finals of the -78 kg women at Rio Olympics 2016.

The Welsh Judo Association is based at the Sport Wales National Centre, Sophia Gardens, Cardiff, as is the Welsh Judo Association Academy.

References

Judo
Judo organizations
Organisations based in Cardiff
Judo in the United Kingdom
Judo in Wales
National members of the International Judo Federation